Blue Bay (Dutch: Blauwbaai) is a beach on the Caribbean island of Curaçao, located close to the fishermen's village of Sint-Michiel to the north-west of Willemstad. The beach is named after a plantation "Blaauw" that was located nearby. There are several restaurants at the beach and golf course.  The beach is used for snorkeling and diving. Close by are a golf court and a hockey pitch. The Blue Bay Sculpture Garden is located nearby in a tourist resort.

References
Curaçao Beaches, Tourism Curaçao
Curaçao Travel Guide — Beaches, New York Times

Beaches of Curaçao